Li Jiaqi (born 28 August 1997), also known as Nicky Li,  is a Chinese actress and model. She is known for her roles in Wait, My Youth, My Girl and Meteor Garden 2018.

Early life
Li Jiaqi was born in Hangzhou, China on August 28, 1997. She graduated Shanghai Institute of Visual Art in June 2019. Her English name is NICKY according to her agency, Feibao Media's data, although it is rarely used, fans would mention her as Nicky Li to differentiate her from other artists with the same name.

Acting career

2017–present: Beginnings
Nicky is a newcomer actress in the Chinese drama and movie industry and has just started her career in acting. She did freelance modelling and acting since 2016. In mid-2017, she had a supporting role in I Cannot Hug You  as a freelance actress. On November 9, 2017, she signed with a talent agency, Feibao Media, and officially started her career as an actress. Her debut drama is the 2018 version of Meteor Garden and she played the role of Jiang Xiao You, the female lead's best friend.

Nicky has had a rough road after her official acting debut in Meteor Garden. She did immediately got a leading role in a youth romance drama Wait, My Youth which was released on Netflix, October 27, 2019. However, she revealed in an essay written by herself that she actually failed numerous auditions for one whole year since then. She mentioned that it was a hard time for her and if she did not persist and commit to the profession she has chosen, she might have given up and quit like many of her peers in the industry. 

After one year without acting job, she eventually got herself several roles and continuously filming three projects back to back in July 2019 to March 2020. In mid July 2019, she filmed a movie 会飞的蚂蚁 as a supporting role. At the end of July to October 2019, she filmed a romantic comedy drama “My Girl” as the female lead with dissociative identity disorder. This drama has been released in June 2020 and the reception is quite positive with more than 10,000 people rated the drama on Douban, as well as getting positive comments from a film critic, Tan Fei. The scriptwriter, Nan Zhen, has also won an award in 2020.

In mid-November 2019, she started filming Ni Chang which is a big budget costume drama consists of 45 episodes and a sister drama to I Will Never Let You Go a drama starring Ariel Lin. This drama is planned to be released by the end of 2020 and a possible TV broadcast.

Personal life
Nicky formed a tight friendship with Hu Yixuan (胡意旋), another newcomer actress, since they met on the set of I Cannot Hug You in mid-2017. She mentioned in a variety show that that time they have spent time together everyday for about two months, then they continued to keep in touch afterwards and become best friends. Nicky and Hu Yixuan has released vlogs in which they went for trips to Japan and Macau together. They often posted pictures of them hanging out together until now.

Filmography

Film

Television series

Awards and nominations

References

External links
 
 
 Li Jia Qi Xiao Hong Shu (Little Red Book)

1997 births
21st-century Chinese actresses
Living people
Chinese television actresses